The women's pole vault event at the 2002 Commonwealth Games was held on 28–29 July.

Medalists

Results

Qualification
Qualification: 4.10 m (Q) or at least 12 best (q) qualified for the final.

Final

References
Official results
Results at BBC

Pole
2002
2002 in women's athletics